Larry James was an American Olympic sprinter.

Larry James may also refer to:

 Larry D. James, Lt. General in the United States Air Force
 Larry C. James, former chief psychologist at Guantanamo, and author of Fixing Hell
 Larry M. James, President and CEO of CitySquare

See also